Sunnersta AIF is a Swedish football club located in Uppsala.

Background
Sunnersta AIF currently plays in Division 4 Uppland which is the sixth tier of  Swedish football. They play their home matches at Sunnersta IP in Uppsala.

The club is affiliated to Upplands Fotbollförbund.

Footnotes

External links
  

Football clubs in Uppsala County